Tetrarhanis stempfferi, the Stempffer's on-off, is a butterfly in the family Lycaenidae. The species is named after French entomologist Henri Stempffer. It is found in Liberia, Ghana, Nigeria, Cameroon, the Republic of the Congo, the Central African Republic, the Democratic Republic of the Congo, Uganda and Kenya. The habitat consists of primary forests.

Subspecies
Tetrarhanis stempfferi stempfferi (Liberia, Ghana, southern Nigeria, Cameroon, Congo, Central African Republic, Democratic Republic of Congo: Uele, Tshopo, Sankuru and Lualaba)
Tetrarhanis stempfferi kigezi (Stempffer, 1956) (Uganda: south-west to the Kigezi district, western Kenya)

References

Butterflies described in 1954
Poritiinae